Shruti Kotwal (born 2 December 1991) is an Indian ice speed skater. She is the country's first professional female ice skater.

Biography 
Kotwal was born and brought up in Pune, Maharashtra, India. When she was seven years old she began roller-skating and held national gold medals in the sport before changing to ice-skating.

At the South Asia Championship in 2011 she secured gold medals in the categories of 500m, 1000m and 1500m. The following year, 2012, she received a scholarship from the International Skating Union, which enabled her to travel to Germany for speed skating training under Canadian skater Jeremy Wotherspoon.  

In 2017 she represented India at the Asian Winter Games. In 2014 she broke the national record she had previously set herself in the 500 metre speed skating event.

She holds 5 gold medals from the Indian National Ice-Skating Championships and a bronze medal from the National Winter Games.

References 

1991 births
Living people
Sportspeople from Pune
Sportswomen from Maharashtra
Indian female speed skaters
Indian female short track speed skaters
Speed skaters at the 2017 Asian Winter Games
South Asian Winter Games gold medalists for India
South Asian Winter Games medalists in short track speed skating
Fergusson College alumni